Marjorie Hillis (1889–1971) was an American author of popular nonfiction books for women in the 1930s. Her book Live Alone and Like It was one of the most popular titles of the decade.

Early life  

Born Margaret Louise Hillis in Peoria, Illinois, Marjorie Hillis was the second of three children of Dr. Newell Dwight Hillis (1858-1929), a Congregationalist minister, and Annie Louise Patrick Hillis (1862-1930), herself a published author.    The family moved to Brooklyn, New York, in 1899, when Marjorie's father became pastor of Plymouth Congregational Church there, a pulpit once held by the famous abolitionist Henry Ward Beecher.  After completing her education at Miss Dana's School for Young Ladies, a private school in New Jersey, and traveling abroad for a year, Marjorie went to work writing captions for Vogue magazine's pattern book.

Literary career

Hillis eventually became Vogue's assistant editor.  In 1936, she published the year's number eight nonfiction bestseller, Live Alone and Like It,  an advice book for young women on how to live independently.   It was followed in 1937 by Orchids on Your Budget, which became that year's number five nonfiction bestseller.  Orchids on Your Budget, which was subtitled Live Smartly on What You Have, was built around hypothetical “cases” that encouraged women to match their goals with their financial means.

Personal life

In 1939, Hillis married Thomas Henry Roulston, a widower who owned a chain of grocery stores in Brooklyn.  He died in 1949.  She died in 1971.  They are buried in Green-Wood Cemetery in Brooklyn.

Notes and references

External links

Scutts, Joanna (2017). The Extra Woman.
"The Single Lady" Episode of What'sHerName Podcast with guest Joanna Scutts.

1889 births
1971 deaths
Writers from Peoria, Illinois
Vogue (magazine) people
20th-century American writers
20th-century American women writers